Women's Lives   Fùnǚ Shēnghuó) was a monthly Chinese periodical which was published from July 1935 to January 1941. It began in Shanghai as the house journal of the Shanghai Women's National Salvation Society   Shànghǎi Fùnǚjiè Jiùguóhuì) under the editorship of the Communist Shen Zijiu. In November 1937, it moved to Wuhan and, later, was again forced to relocate to the provisional Republican capital Chongqing, where Cao Mengjun served as editor-in-chief.

Its stated aim was to "enlighten the majority of women so they can achieve their own emancipation through participation in social movements". The inaugural issue included an article arguing women should devote themselves to nationalism and social reform. It opposed the return of women to the home under what it called the "new good-wife and wise-mother-ism" espoused by some Nationalist politicians. When the Ping opera singer Bai Yushuang was expelled by the mayor of Beiping (now Beijing) for the revealing attire and obscene lyrics of her 1933 Chasing Flies, Women's Lives reported icily that "thousands of square miles of Chinese territory have been occupied by the Japanese without any resistance, but if a woman offends public decency, she must be expelled."

A major contributor was Huang Biyao, a graduate of Tokyo's Women's Advanced Teacher's School and an educator at many Chinese high schools.

References

Citations

Bibliography
 .

1935 establishments in China
1941 disestablishments in China
Chinese-language magazines
Monthly magazines published in China
Women's magazines published in China
Communist magazines
Defunct magazines published in China
Feminism in China
Feminist magazines
Magazines established in 1935
Magazines disestablished in 1941
Magazines published in Shanghai
Mass media in Wuhan
Mass media in Chongqing